Shadowboxing is an exercise used in the training for combat sports. Shadowboxing is sometimes an alternative translation for tai chi, the Chinese martial arts.

Shadowboxing may also refer to:

Film and TV
 Shadowboxing (2010 film), a 2010 American film
 Shadowboxing (2005 film), a 2005 Russian 4-episode film
 "Shadowboxing" (Heroes), a 2009 episode of Heroes

Music
Shadowboxing, album by Martinez (band) 2005

Songs
"Shadow Boxing" by Nasty Habits
"Shadow Boxing" by Teena Marie
"Shadowboxin'" by GZA
"Shadowboxing" by Ed Harcourt
"Shadowboxing" by Martinez (band)
"Shadowboxing" by Zion I
"Shadowboxing" by Sara Hickman by Edie Brickell & New Bohemians
"Shadowboxing" by Methyl Ethel
"Shadowboxing" by Parkway Drive

See also